The 2014 Arkansas gubernatorial election was held on November 4, 2014, to elect the Governor of Arkansas, concurrently with the election to Arkansas's Class II U.S. Senate seat, as well as other elections to the United States Senate in other states and elections to the United States House of Representatives and various state and local elections. As of 2023, this is the last time the Governor’s office in Arkansas changed partisan control.

Incumbent Democratic Governor Mike Beebe was ineligible to run for re-election due to term limits established by the Arkansas Constitution. Arkansas is one of eight states that limits its Governors to two terms for life. The Democrats nominated former U.S. Representative Mike Ross and the Republicans nominated former DEA Administrator, former U.S. Representative and 2006 nominee Asa Hutchinson.

Hutchinson defeated Ross and two minor party candidates in the general election, winning by the largest margin recorded for a Republican in an open-seat gubernatorial race since Reconstruction. The race was called for Hutchinson roughly half an hour after the polls closed. Hutchinson's victory gave the GOP complete control of state government for the first time since the end of Reconstruction.

Democratic primary

Candidates

Declared
 Lynette "Doc" Bryant, activist
 Mike Ross, former U.S. Representative

Withdrew
 Bill Halter, former Lieutenant Governor of Arkansas and candidate for the U.S. Senate in 2010 (endorsed Ross)
 Dustin McDaniel, Arkansas Attorney General

Declined
 Shane Broadway, interim director of the Department of Higher Education and former state senator
 John Burkhalter, former State Highway Commissioner (running for Lieutenant Governor)
 Conner Eldridge, U.S. Attorney for the Western District of Arkansas
 G. David Gearhart, chancellor of the University of Arkansas
 Pat Hays, former Mayor of North Little Rock (running for AR-02)
 Keith Ingram, state senator (endorsed Ross)
 Bruce Maloch, state senator
 Michael Malone, president and CEO of the Northwest Arkansas Council
 Vic Snyder, former U.S. Representative
 Paul Suskie, former chairman of the Arkansas Public Service Commission and candidate for Attorney General of Arkansas in 2006
 Chris Thomason, Chancellor of the University of Arkansas Community College at Hope and former state representative
 Robert F. Thompson, state senator (endorsed Ross)
 Darrin Williams, state representative, former Speaker of the Arkansas House of Representatives

Endorsements

Polling

Results

Republican primary

Candidates

Declared
 Curtis Coleman, founder of a food safety company and candidate for the U.S. Senate in 2010
 Asa Hutchinson, former Administrator of the DEA, former U.S. Representative and nominee for governor in 2006

Withdrew
 Debra Hobbs, state representative (running for Lieutenant Governor)

Declined
 Davy Carter, Speaker of the Arkansas House of Representatives
 Tom Cotton, U.S. Representative (running for the U.S. Senate)
 Rick Crawford, U.S. Representative
 Mark Darr, former Lieutenant Governor of Arkansas
 G. David Gearhart, Chancellor of the University of Arkansas
 Tim Griffin, U.S. Representative
 Missy Irvin, state senator
 Jim Keet, former state senator and nominee for governor in 2010
 Johnny Key, state senator
 Mark Martin, Secretary of State of Arkansas (running for re-election)
 Sheffield Nelson, businessman and nominee for governor in 1990 and 1994
 Steve Womack, U.S. Representative

Endorsements

Polling

Results

Third parties

Candidates

Declared
 Josh Drake (Green), attorney and nominee for Arkansas's 4th congressional district in 2008, 2010 and 2012
 Frank Gilbert (Libertarian), DeKalb Township Constable, former Mayor of Tull and nominee for the State Senate in 2012

Declined
 Sheffield Nelson (Independent), businessman and Republican nominee for governor in 1990 and 1994

General election

Debates
Complete video of debate, September 19, 2014 - C-SPAN
Complete video of debate, October 7, 2014 - C-SPAN

Predictions

Polling

Results

References

External links
Arkansas gubernatorial election, 2014 at Ballotpedia
Official campaign websites (archived)
Mike Ross (D) for Governor
Asa Hutchinson (R) for Governor
Frank Gilbert (L) for Governor
Josh Drake (G) for Governor

Arkansas
Gubernatorial
2014